Bobby Marcellous McCain (born August 18, 1993) is an American football free safety. He played college football at Memphis and was drafted by the Miami Dolphins in the fifth round of the 2015 NFL Draft. McCain also played for the Washington Football Team / Commanders.

High school career
A native of Sylacauga, Alabama, McCain attended Oxford High School, where he played football and was teammates with Kwon Alexander. McCain was considered a three-star recruit by Rivals.com and was listed as the No. 36 prospect from the state of Alabama in 2011. He committed to Memphis to play college football over offers from Auburn, Kentucky, Mississippi State, and Tennessee, among others.

College career
McCain played his college career at the University of Memphis where he was a four-year starter at and had 12 career interceptions, including 11 in his final two years.

Professional career

Miami Dolphins

2015 
The Miami Dolphins selected McCain in the fifth round with the 145th overall pick in the 2015 NFL Draft. McCain was the 18th cornerback drafted in 2015. 

On May 7, 2015, the Miami Dolphins signed McCain to a four-year, $2.50 million contract that includes a signing bonus of $228,288.

Throughout training camp, McCain competed to be a starting cornerback against Jamar Taylor, Tony Lippett, Brice McCain, and Will Davis. Head coach Joe Philbin named McCain the fourth cornerback on the depth chart to begin the regular season, behind Brent Grimes, Jamar Taylor, and Will Davis.

He made his professional regular season debut in the Miami Dolphins' season-opening 17–10 win at the Washington Redskins. On October 5, 2015, the Miami Dolphins fired head coach Joe Philbin after they began the season with a 1–3 record. Tight ends coach Dan Campbell was named the interim head coach for the remainder of the season. On December 6, 2015, he collected a season-high seven solo tackles and deflected a pass in the Dolphins' 15–13 victory against the Baltimore Ravens in Week 13. He finished his rookie season in 2015 with 28 combined tackles (23 solo) and four pass deflections in 16 games and four starts.

2016 
On January 9, 2016, the Miami Dolphins hired Chicago Bears' offensive coordinator Adam Gase as their new head coach. McCain entered training camp as the first-team nickelback, but saw competition for his role from Jordan Lucas and Tyler Patmon. Head coach Adam Gase named McCain the third cornerback on the Dolphins' depth chart to begin the regular season, behind Byron Maxwell and rookie Xavien Howard. He was also named the first-team nickelback.

On September 29, 2016, McCain recorded four combined tackles, deflected a pass, and made his first career sack on Andy Dalton during a 22–7 loss at the Cincinnati Bengals. On November 6, 2016, McCain recorded three solo tackles, broke up a pass, and made his first career interception in the Dolphins' 27–23 win against the New York Jets in Week 9. McCain intercepted a pass by New York Jets' quarterback Ryan Fitzpatrick, that was originally intended for tight end Austin Seferian-Jenkins, and returned it for a 17-yard gain in the third quarter. In Week 12, he collected a season-high five combined tackles and broke up one pass during a 31–24 victory against the San Francisco 49ers in Week 12. He finished the 2016 NFL season with 45 combined tackles (32 solo), six pass deflections, one interception, one sack, and a forced fumble in 16 games and eight starts.

The Miami Dolphins finished second in the AFC East with a 10–6 record and earned a Wild Card berth. On January 8, 2017, McCain started in his first career playoff game and recorded two tackles as the Dolphins lost the AFC wild card game 30–12 at the Pittsburgh Steelers.

2017 
On January 12, 2017, the Miami Dolphins announced their decision to promote linebackers coach Matt Burke to defensive coordinator after Vance Joseph accepted the head coaching position with the Denver Broncos. During training camp, McCain competed to retain his position at nickelback against Tony Lippett, Michael Thomas, Cordrea Tankersley, Alterraun Verner, Jordan Lucas, and Lafayette Pitts. Head coach Adam Gase named McCain the first-team nickelback to start the season, behind Byron Maxwell and Xavien Howard.

On November 26, 2017, during Week 12 against the New England Patriots, McCain was ejected for throwing a punch at wide receiver Danny Amendola. In Week 16, he collected a season-high eight combined tackles and broke up a pass during a 29–13 loss at the Kansas City Chiefs. McCain finished the season with 48 combined tackles (36 solo), seven pass deflections, two interceptions, and a sack in 16 games and seven starts.

2018 
On June 1, 2018, McCain signed a four-year, $27 million contract extension with the Dolphins with $13 million guaranteed. During training camp, McCain competed to be a starting cornerback against Cordrea Tankersley. Head coach Adam Gase named McCain and Xavien Howard the starting cornerbacks to begin the regular season in 2018. Overall, McCain finished the 2018 season with 61 total tackles, two sacks, one interception, and five passes defended.

2019
In Week 3 against the Dallas Cowboys, McCain recorded his first interception of the season off Dak Prescott in the 31–6 loss. On November 20, 2019, McCain was placed on injured reserve, ending his season. In nine games, he finished with 25 total tackles, two interceptions, and three passes defended.

2020
In the 2020 season, McCain played in all 16 regular season games, of which he started 15. He finished with 46 total tackles, one interception, and five passes defended. McCain was released by the Dolphins on May 6, 2021.

Washington Football Team / Commanders

McCain signed a one-year contract with the Washington Football Team on May 17, 2021. McCain recorded his first interception of the season against Kansas City Chiefs quarterback Patrick Mahomes in Week 6. In the Week 10 win over the Tampa Bay Buccaneers, McCain intercepted Tom Brady in the first half of the game. He recorded two interceptions against New York Giants quarterback Jake Fromm in the final game of the season and returned one of them for his first career touchdown.

McCain re-signed with the team on a two-year, $11 million contract on March 17, 2022. McCain would play slot cornerback later in the season. He was released on February 27, 2023.

References

External links
 Memphis Tigers bio

1993 births
Living people
People from Oxford, Alabama
Players of American football from Alabama
American football cornerbacks
Memphis Tigers football players
Miami Dolphins players
American football safeties
Washington Football Team players
Washington Commanders players
Ed Block Courage Award recipients